Farthingloe is a village west of Dover  in southeast England.

External links

Villages in Kent
Dover District